Jean-Guy Poitras is a Canadian badminton referee, originally from Notre-Dame-de-Lourdes, in northwest New Brunswick.

He is a professor of physical education at the Edmundston Campus of the University of Moncton and was Dean there from 1996 to 2001. He has been involved in badminton since the 1970s and has refereed more than 600 international matches, including those in the 2000 Summer Olympics.

References
https://web.archive.org/web/20110614132557/http://www.nbsportshalloffame.nb.ca/sports/fr/membres/voir_membre.aspx?id=191

Living people
Year of birth missing (living people)
Badminton in Canada